Branko Ostojić (born 3 January 1984) is a Bosnian Serb footballer who plays as defensive midfielder for Sloboda Čačak.

Club career
Born in Goražde, SR Bosnia and Herzegovina (still within Yugoslavia), Ostojić started his career in Serbia where he spent his first five years playing for Sloboda Čačak at the start of his senior career. After his departure from Sloboda he spent time playing for several other third level clubs. He joined Javor Ivanjica in 2011 and played in the Serbian SuperLiga.

On June 14, 2013 the Greek superleague side Veria signed Ostojić on a free transfer. He scored his first goal for the club in season 2013-14 with an amazing shot against Skoda Xanthi, during the 31st matchday of the season. Despite being in Veria only for a season, Ostojić was named as the third club captain during the 2014-15 season.

Ostojić renewed his contract with Veria for one more year on 21 May 2015.

Ostojić left FK Voždovac at the end of 2018.

In summer 2019, he moved from Radnički Kragujevac to Borac Čačak.

References

External sources
 Stats and bio at Utakmica.rs 
 

1984 births
Living people
People from Goražde
Association football midfielders
Serbs of Bosnia and Herzegovina
Bosnia and Herzegovina footballers
FK Radnički 1923 players
FK FAP players
FK Javor Ivanjica players
Veria F.C. players
OFI Crete F.C. players
Doxa Drama F.C. players
FK Voždovac players
FK Borac Čačak players
Serbian SuperLiga players
Super League Greece players
Football League (Greece) players
Serbian First League players
Bosnia and Herzegovina expatriate footballers
Expatriate footballers in Greece
Bosnia and Herzegovina expatriate sportspeople in Greece